The Spain men's national 3x3 team is the 3x3 basketball team representing Spain in international competitions, organized and run by the Spanish Basketball Federation.

Senior Competitions

World Championships

European Games

European Championships

Mediterranean Games

Most capped players

Youth Competitions

Performance at Youth Olympics

Performance at Under-18 World Championships

See also 

 Spanish Basketball Federation
 Spain men's national basketball team
 Spain women's national 3x3 team

References

External links 
Spanish Basketball Federation website

3x3 team
Men's national 3x3 basketball teams